Futebol Clube de Cuntum, also known as Cavalos Brancos ("white horses") is a Guinea-Bissauan football club based in the Cuntum Madina district of the capital Bissau.

The club was established in 1997 and was promoted to the 1st division in Guinean football, the Campeonato Nacional da Guine-Bissau in 2010.

Cuntum were finalists in the 2018 Taça Nacional da Guiné Bissau, losing 2–1 to Sport Bissau e Benfica.

References 

Association football clubs established in 1997
FC Cuntum